Oak Grove is an unincorporated community in Macon County, North Carolina, United States, situated on North Carolina Highway 28, north-northwest of Franklin. It lies at an elevation of 1988 feet (606 m).

References

Unincorporated communities in Macon County, North Carolina
Unincorporated communities in North Carolina